James Corcoran (1 October 1885 – 7 May 1965) was an Australian politician. He was the Labor member for Victoria in the South Australian House of Assembly from 1945 until his defeat in 1947, and again from 1953 until 1956, when he transferred to the nearby seat of Millicent. He retired in 1962, and was succeeded by his son, future Premier Des Corcoran.

References

 

1885 births
1965 deaths
Members of the South Australian House of Assembly
Place of birth missing
Australian Labor Party members of the Parliament of South Australia
20th-century Australian politicians